The DGC Allan King Award for Best Documentary Film is an annual Canadian award, presented by the Directors Guild of Canada to honour the year's best direction in documentary films in Canada. The award was renamed in 2010 to honour influential Canadian documentarian Allan King following his death in 2009. Individual episodes of documentary television series have occasionally been nominated for the award, although nominees and winners are usually theatrical documentary films.

Winners and nominees

2000s

2010s

2020s

References

Allan King
Canadian documentary film awards